Nationality words link to articles with information on the nation's poetry or literature (for instance, Irish or France).

Events
October 5 – Model, poet and artist Elizabeth Siddal (d. 1862) is exhumed at Highgate Cemetery in London in order to recover the manuscript of Dante Gabriel Rossetti's Poems buried with her.

Works published in English

United Kingdom
 Robert Browning, The Ring and the Book, Volumes 3 and 4 (Volume 3 published in January, Volume 4 in February; see also The Ring and the Book 1868)
 C. S. Calverley, Theocritus Translated into English Verse
 A. H. Clough, Poems and Prose Remains (see also Letters 1865)
 W. S. Gilbert, Bab Ballads, first published in Fun, a comic journal (see also More 'Bab' Ballads 1872)
 John Keble, Miscellaneous Poems
 William Morris, The Earthly Paradise, Part 3 (published this year, although the book states "1870"; Parts 1 and 2 1868; Part 4 1870)
 Dante Gabriel Rossetti, Poems
 Alfred Lord Tennyson, The Holy Grail, and Other Poems, with "The Coming of Arthur," "The Holy Grail," "Pelleas and Ettarre," and "The Passing of Arthur" (published this year, although the book states "1870"; see also Idylls of the King 1859, 1870, 1889, "The Last Tournament" 1871, Gareth and Lynette 1872, "Balin and Balan" in Tiresias 1885)

United States
 William Cullen Bryant:
 Hymns
 Some Notices of the Life and Writings of Fitz-Greene Halleck
 William Dean Howells, No Love Lost: A Romance of Travel
 James Russell Lowell, Under the Willows and Other Poems
 Joaquin Miller, Joaquin et al.
 Edmund Clarence Stedman, The Blameless Prince and Other Poems
 John Greenleaf Whittier, Among the Hills

Other
 Dutt Family, Dutt Family Album, London: Longmans, Green and Co.; India, Indian poetry in English
 Charles Heavysege, Saul: A Drama in Three Parts, second edition, revised (see also Saul, first edition, 1857); Canada
 Henry Kendall, Leaves from Australian Forests, Australia

Works published in other languages

France
 Charles Baudelaire, published posthumously (died 1867):
 L'Art romantique
 Le Spleen de Paris/Petits Poémes en Prose ("Paris Spleen"), 51 short prose poems
 Comte de Lautréamont, Les Chants de Maldoror
 Paul Verlaine, Les Fêtes galantes

Other
 Jan Neruda, Zpěvy páteční ("Friday Songs"), Czech

Births
Death years link to the corresponding "[year] in poetry" article:
 February 11 – Else Lasker-Schüler (died 1945), German
 May 12 – Frank Morton (died 1923), English-born Australian poet and journalist
 May 23 – Olivia Ward Bush-Banks, née Ward (died 1944), African-American author, poet and journalist
 June 10 – Arthur Shearly Cripps (died 1952), English Anglican priest, short story writer and poet spending most of his life in Southern Rhodesia (modern-day Zimbabwe)
 July 8 – William Vaughn Moody (died 1910), American
 August 6:
 Marie E. J. Pitt (died 1948), Australian poet, journalist and political activist
 David McKee Wright (died 1928), Irish-born poet and journalist, active in New Zealand and Australia
 August 7 – E. J. Brady (died 1952), Australian poet, wharf clerk, farmer and journalist; founder of the artist colony at Mallacoota, Victoria in Australia
 August 10 – Laurence Binyon (died 1943), English poet, dramatist and art scholar
 August 21 – Will H. Ogilvie (died 1963), Scottish-Australian narrative poet and horseman
 October 6 – Bo Bergman (died 1967), Swedish writer and critic
 November 15
 Charlotte Mew (suicide 1928), English
 Arnold Wall (died 1966), Ceylonese-born New Zealand philologist, poet, botanist and radio broadcaster
 November 20 – Zinaida Gippius (died 1945), Russian poet, novelist and playwright
 December 1 – George Sterling (died 1926), American
 December 22 –  Edwin Arlington Robinson (died 1935), American Pulitzer Prize-winning poet
 December 30 – Stephen Leacock (died 1944), English-born Canadian humorist and political scientist
 Also:
 Miltiadis Malakasis (died 1943), Greek
 Balawantrai Thakore (died 1952), the first Imagist and formalist poet in  Indian, Gujarati-language literature; introduced into Gujarati the sonnet and prithvi meter, "which is closest to English blank verse", according to The Handbook of Twentieth-Century Indian Literature

Deaths
Birth years link to the corresponding "[year] in poetry" article:
 January 30 – Charlotte Alington Barnard (born 1830), English poet and composer of ballads and hymns
 February 15 – Mirza Ghalib (born 1797), classical Urdu and Persian poet from India
 February 28 – Alphonse de Lamartine (born 1790), French writer, poet and politician
 November 3 – Andreas Kalvos (born 1792), Greek

See also

 19th century in poetry
 19th century in literature
 List of years in poetry
 List of years in literature
 Victorian literature
 French literature of the 19th century
 Poetry

Notes

Poetry
19th-century poetry